Ioan Bogdan may refer to:

 Ioan Bogdan (historian) (1864–1919), Romanian historian and philologist
 Ioan Bogdan (footballer) (born 1956), Romanian footballer

See also
 Ion Bogdan (1915–1992), Romanian footballer and manager
 Ioan
 Bogdan